Tofig Huseynov (19 April 1954 – 26 February 1992) was an Azerbaijani soldier and National Hero of Azerbaijan, He commanded the Khojaly Self-Defence Battalion.

Biography

Huseynov was born on April 19, 1954 in Khojaly, in what was then the Azerbaijan SSR. From 1961 to 1971, he studied at secondary school. Then, he graduated from the local agricultural technical school in the city of Aghdam. From 1974 to 1976 he served in the ranks of the Soviet army in the city of Alma-Ata, the capital of the Kazakh SSR (now Kazakhstan). Returning to his homeland, he taught basic military training at a secondary school in Khojaly.

With the beginning of the First Nagorno-Karabakh War, he took part in the defense of Khojaly. He was one of the founders of the Khojaly Self-Defense Battalion in 1991, and was later appointed commander of this battalion. After an operation in which 10 Armenian servicemen were captured, he was awarded the rank of major. He was a victim of Khojaly Massacre, dying on 26 February 1992.

Legacy 
By the decree of the President, Huseynov was awarded the title of the National Hero of Azerbaijan (posthumously). He was buried in Martyr's Avenue of Baku.

See also 
 National Heroes of Azerbaijan
 Khojaly Massacre

References

Links 
 HÜSEYNOV TOFİQ MİRSİYAB oğlu 
 Хавва Мамедова. Ходжалы. Шехиды и Шахиды
 Список погибших в Ходжалинской резне 
 Список погибших во время Ходжалинской трагедии. Управление делами Президента Азербайджанской Республики. ПРЕЗИДЕНТСКАЯ БИБЛИОТЕКА

Khojaly Massacre
Azerbaijani military personnel of the Nagorno-Karabakh War
National Heroes of Azerbaijan
Victims of the Khojaly massacre